Louis-Édouard Roberge (11 September 1896 – 1 July 1982) was a Liberal party member of the House of Commons of Canada. He was born in Plessisville, Quebec and became a merchant by career.

He was first elected at the Stanstead riding in the 1949 general election then re-elected in 1953 and 1957. Roberge was defeated by René Létourneau of the Progressive Conservative party in the 1958 election.

Electoral record

External links
 

1896 births
1982 deaths
Canadian merchants
Liberal Party of Canada MPs
Members of the House of Commons of Canada from Quebec
People from Centre-du-Québec